Michelle Behennah (born 7 January 1977, Singapore) is a British model.

Modelling career 

Behennah has modeled swimsuits for [[Sports Illustrated Swimsuit Issue|Sports Illustrated'''s Swimsuit Issue]], in 1999, 2000 and 2001. In addition to her Sports Illustrated shoots, she was the object/subject of Joanne Gair's inaugural body painting works as part of the Sports Illustrated'' Swimsuit Issue.

Notes

External links 

Sports Illustrated's Michelle Behennah Gallery

1977 births
Living people
English female models
People from Hathersage